Edward J. Brown (1909-1991) was an American literary scholar and Professor at Stanford University. He is known as a pioneer in the academic study of Russian literature in the United States.

References

American literary critics
Stanford University faculty
1909 births
1991 deaths